Tillington may refer to more than one place in England:
Tillington, Herefordshire
Tillington, Staffordshire
Tillington, West Sussex